

The Blackburn R.B.2 Sydney (serial N241) was a long-range maritime patrol flying boat developed for the Royal Air Force in 1930, in response to Air Ministry Specification R.5/27. It was a parasol-winged braced monoplane of typical flying boat arrangement with triple tailfins and its three engines arranged on the wing's leading edge. After evaluation, it was not ordered into production and no further examples were built.

With development of the Sydney abandoned, construction of a cargo-carrying variant powered by radial engines, the C.B.2 Nile was also ended.

Specifications (Sydney)

See also

References
Notes

Bibliography
 
 
 Blackburn Sydney – British Aircraft Directory

External links

 The Blackburn "Sydney" Flying Boat in Flight, 5 September 1930
 Blackburn flying boats 1924–1940
 Picture of the Sydney N241
 "Blackburn R.B. 2 Sydney", Youtube.com first flight
 "Huge All-Metal Flying Boat Weighs Ten Tons", March 1931, Popular Mechanics

Sydney
1930s British patrol aircraft
Cancelled military aircraft projects of the United Kingdom
Flying boats
Trimotors
Parasol-wing aircraft
Aircraft first flown in 1930